Bandar-e Gaz County is located in Golestan province, Iran. The capital of the county is Bandar-e Gaz. At the 2006 census, the county's population was 46,179 in 12,059 households. The following census in 2011 counted 46,315 people in 13,775 households. At the 2016 census, the county's population was 46,130 in 15,247 households.

Administrative divisions

The population history of Bandar-e Gaz County's administrative divisions over three consecutive censuses is shown in the following table. The latest census shows two districts, four rural districts, and two cities.

References

 

Counties of Golestan Province